Torbay Council is the local authority for the unitary authority of Torbay in Devon, England. Until 1 April 1998 it was a non-metropolitan district. From 2005 to 2019 it had a directly elected mayor. The council is elected every four years.

Political control

Borough council
Since the first election to the council in 1973 political control of the council has been held by the following parties:

Non-metropolitan district

Unitary authority

Leadership
Prior to 2005, political leadership was provided by the leader of the council. The leader from 2003 to 2005 was:

Between 2005 and 2019 the council had a directly elected mayor. The mayors were:

In 2019 the council reverted to having a leader instead of a directly elected mayor. The leader since 2019 has been:

Council elections

Non-metropolitan district elections
1973 Torbay Borough Council election
1976 Torbay Borough Council election
1979 Torbay Borough Council election
1983 Torbay Borough Council election (New ward boundaries)
1984 Torbay Borough Council election
1986 Torbay Borough Council election
1987 Torbay Borough Council election
1988 Torbay Borough Council election
1990 Torbay Borough Council election
1991 Torbay Borough Council election
1995 Torbay Borough Council election

Unitary authority elections
1997 Torbay Council election
2000 Torbay Council election
2003 Torbay Council election (New ward boundaries)
2007 Torbay Council election
2011 Torbay Council election
2015 Torbay Council election
2019 Torbay Council election

Mayoral elections
A referendum took place on 14 July 2005 on establishing a directly elected mayor. The result saw a majority in favour with 18,074 in support and 14,684 opposed on a 32.1% turnout.

2005 Torbay Council mayoral election
2011 Torbay Council mayoral election
2015 Torbay Council mayoral election

A referendum took place on 5 May 2016 on reverting to a leader and cabinet system. The result saw a majority in favour of a leader and cabinet system with 15,846 votes in support of the leader and cabinet system and 9,511 wanting to stick with an elected mayor, on a 25.3% turnout.

Borough result maps

By-election results

1997–2000

2000–2003

2003–2007

2007–2011

2011–2015

2015–2019

References

External links
Torbay Council
By-election results

 
Council elections in Devon
Unitary authority elections in England